George Wentworth may refer to:
Sir George Wentworth (of Woolley) (1599–1660), English MP for Pontefract 1640–1642
Sir George Wentworth (of Wentworth Woodhouse) (1609–?), English MP for Pontefract 1640–1644
George Wentworth-FitzWilliam (1817–1874),  British politician